The Under Secretary of Commerce for Industry and Security, or USC(IS), is a high-ranking official in the United States Department of Commerce and the principal advisor to the United States Secretary of Commerce on the export of sensitive goods and technologies. The Under Secretary is the head of the Bureau of Industry and Security within the Commerce Department.

The Under Secretary is appointed by the President of the United States with the consent of the United States Senate to serve at the pleasure of the President. On July 13, 2021, President Joe Biden announced that he would nominate former Department of Defense official Alan Estevez to the role and he was confirmed unanimously by the Senate on March 31, 2022.

Overview
The Under Secretary of Commerce for Industry and Security is the principal staff officer of the Commerce Department responsible for advancing United States national security and foreign policy. The Under Secretary oversees the Bureau of Industry and Security.

The Under Secretary promotes American national security objectives by ensuring an effective export control and treaty compliance system and promoting continued strategic technology leadership. This includes primary focus on Export restrictions, export administration, anti-boycott enforcement, implementation of certain treaty requirements, defense priorities and allocations, strategic trade, and promotion of the defense-industrial base of the United States.

With the rank of Under Secretary, the USC(IS) is a Level III position within the Executive Schedule. Since Fiscal Year 2021, under the political appointee pay freeze, the functional annual rate of pay for Level III is $168,400.

History
The position of Under Secretary, as well as the Bureau of Industry and Security, was created in 1985 to move the national security and export control functions away from the International Trade Administration which performs trade promotion among other activities.

Former Under Secretaries

Reporting officials
Officials reporting to the USC(IS) include:
Deputy Under Secretary of Commerce for Industry and Security
Assistant Secretary of Commerce for Export Administration
Deputy Assistant Secretary of Commerce for Export Administration
Assistant Secretary of Commerce for Export Enforcement
Deputy Assistant Secretary of Commerce for Export Enforcement
Chief Financial Officer and Director of Administration
Chief Information Officer
Chief Counsel for Industry and Security (Office of the General Counsel)

References

External links
 Under Secretary for Industry and Security
Export Control Reform Act of 2018 (ECRA)